Glarner is a surname. Notable people with the surname include:

 Fritz Glarner (1899–1972), Swiss-American painter
 Jean Glarner (born 1940), Swiss field hockey player
 Stefan Glarner (born 1987), Swiss footballer

See also
 Garner (surname)